Marc Coppola is an American actor and DJ working for KGB-FM in San Diego, California and WAXQ and WLTW in New York City.

Personal life
Marc's father, August Coppola, was a professor of literature, while his mother, Joy Vogelsang, is a dancer and choreographer; the two divorced in 1976. Coppola's mother was of German and Polish descent, and his father was an Italian American, with his paternal grandparents being Carmine Coppola, a composer and flutist, and Italia Pennino, an actress. Through his father, Coppola is the nephew of director Francis Ford Coppola and actress Talia Shire, the cousin of director Sofia Coppola, Robert Schwartzman, actor and lead singer of the band Rooney, and actor and former Phantom Planet drummer Jason Schwartzman. Coppola's brother is actor Nicolas Cage.

Coppola is married to actress Elizabeth Seton Brindak.

Career
Coppola entered the film industry at a young age thanks to his family. He first appeared in Apocalypse Now (1979) where he was also in the casting department. Coppola acted in 11 other films and two episodes of Law & Order. He worked as a DJ at KLOS 95.5 FM in Los Angeles, California, WYXE and WMAD FM in Madison, Wisconsin in the late 1970s, WBAB 102.3 FM in Babylon, New York, WRCN 103.9 FM in Riverhead, New York, WPLJ 95.5 FM New York City and New York's WAPP 103.5 FM  in the 1980s as well as New York's K-ROCK WXRK 92.3 FM in the late '80s and early '90s. 

He appeared several times as a guest on The Howard Stern Show, having once hosted the show before Stern's.  In 1991, Marc played a Howard Stern based sardonic radio talk show host in Eric Zaccar's political comedy drama for the stage, Housing.           

After WXRK switched formats Coppola left the station, eventually resurfacing at WAXQ hosting afternoon drive, morning drive, then late evenings. On weekdays, Coppola presented on Clear Channel's I Heart Radio "Big Classic Hits" format 10am to 3pm EST and "Classic Rock" format 6am-10am EST Weekends.  He has done the swing shift on both WAXQ and Q104.3 and WLTW 106.7 LITE FM and has also been on KGB-FM 101.5FM in San Diego, California at weekends at 100.3 FM WBIG-FM in Washington DC.

Filmography

See also
Coppola family tree

References

External links

Marc Coppola's Q104.3 Blog

American radio DJs
American male film actors
American male television actors
American people of German descent
American people of Polish descent
People of Campanian descent
People of Lucanian descent
Marc
American people of Italian descent
Living people
Year of birth missing (living people)